Soldiers of the Sky is a 1941 American short documentary film about the 501st Parachute Infantry Regiment directed by Earl Allvine. It was part of Adventures of the Newsreel Cameraman, a series of documentary shorts produced by 20th Century Fox. It was nominated for an Academy Award for Best Documentary Short.

References

External links

1941 films
1941 short films
1941 documentary films
American short documentary films
American black-and-white films
20th Century Fox short films
Films about the United States Army Air Forces
Black-and-white documentary films
American World War II propaganda shorts
1940s short documentary films
1940s English-language films
1940s American films